The Rwanda Civil Aviation Authority (RCAA) is the civil aviation authority of Rwanda. Its headquarters are at Kigali International Airport in Kigali. The authority was established by Law No. 21/2004 of 10/08/2004, replacing the Rwanda Airport Authority, which had been established in 1986. Law No. 44/2006 of 05/10/2006 reworked the organization as the RCAA.

References 
Civil aviation in Rwanda
Rwanda
Government of Rwanda
Transport organisations based in Rwanda

External links 
Rwanda Civil Aviation Authority